Anthony's woodrat (Neotoma bryanti anthonyi) is an extinct subspecies of Bryant's woodrat in the family Cricetidae. It was found only on Isla Todos Santos in Baja California, Mexico.  It is thought to have been driven to extinction through predation from feral cats.

References

Neotoma
Extinct mammals of North America
Extinct rodents
Mammals described in 1898
Taxonomy articles created by Polbot